The men's 96 kg competition of the weightlifting events at the 2019 Pan American Games in Lima, Peru, was held on July 29 at the Coliseo Mariscal Caceres.

Results
16 athletes from fourteen countries took part.

References

External links
Results

Weightlifting at the 2019 Pan American Games